The CONCACAF Gold Cup is North America's major tournament in senior men's football and determines the continental champion. Until 1989, the tournament was known as CONCACAF Championship. It is currently held every two years. From 1996 to 2005, nations from other confederations have regularly joined the tournament as invitees. In earlier editions, the continental championship was held in different countries, but since the inception of the Gold Cup in 1991, the United States are constant hosts or co-hosts.

From 1973 to 1989, the tournament doubled as the confederation's World Cup qualification. CONCACAF's representative team at the FIFA Confederations Cup was decided by a play-off between the winners of the last two tournament editions in 2015 via the CONCACAF Cup, but was then discontinued along with the Confederations Cup.

Since the inaugural tournament in 1963, the Gold Cup was held 26 times and has been won by seven different nations, most often by Mexico (11 titles).

Ecuador have participated as invitees once, in 2002. After one victory and one defeat in the Group stage, Ecuador was sent home with a stroke of bad luck: All three teams were equal on both points and goals, and lots were drawn to determine the teams' positions. Haiti and Canada were drawn into first and second place and advanced to the quarter-finals, while Ecuador were eliminated.

Record at the CONCACAF Championship/Gold Cup

Record

Match Overview

2002 CONCACAF Gold Cup

Group stage

Record Players

The following ten players have been fielded in both Gold Cup matches for Ecuador:

Goalscorers

Both Ecuadorian goals were scored by Álex Aguinaga, late in the match against Canada, one of them per penalty.

References

Countries at the CONCACAF Gold Cup
Ecuador national football team